Raúl Duany Bueno  (born 4 January 1975) is a Cuban decathlete, who holds the current Cuban record. After retiring he joined the coaching staff of the Cuban national athletics team. 
Currently, Raúl Duany Bueno is a gym teacher at the school "Cumbres International School San Javier"(CISSJ) in Zapopan, Jalisco, México.

Achievements

External links

Picture of Raúl Duany

References

1975 births
Living people
Cuban decathletes
Athletes (track and field) at the 1996 Summer Olympics
Athletes (track and field) at the 2000 Summer Olympics
Athletes (track and field) at the 1999 Pan American Games
Olympic athletes of Cuba
Cuban athletics coaches
Pan American Games medalists in athletics (track and field)
Pan American Games bronze medalists for Cuba
Universiade medalists in athletics (track and field)
Central American and Caribbean Games gold medalists for Cuba
Competitors at the 1993 Central American and Caribbean Games
Competitors at the 1998 Central American and Caribbean Games
Universiade gold medalists for Cuba
Central American and Caribbean Games medalists in athletics
Medalists at the 1999 Summer Universiade
Medalists at the 2001 Summer Universiade
Medalists at the 1999 Pan American Games